The men's snowboard cross competition of the Vancouver 2010 Olympics was held at Cypress Mountain on February 15, 2010.

Results

Qualification

Elimination round

1/8 round
The top 32 qualifiers advanced to the 1/8 round. From here, they participated in four-person elimination races, with the top two from each race advancing. 

Heat 1

Heat 2

Heat 3

Heat 4

Heat 5

Heat 6

Heat 7

Heat 8

Quarterfinals

Quarterfinal 1

Quarterfinal  2

Quarterfinal 3

Quarterfinal 4

Semifinals

Semifinal  1

Semifinal 2

Finals
Small Final

Large Final

Final Classification

References

External links
2010 Winter Olympics results: Men's Snowboard Cross, from http://www.vancouver2010.com/; retrieved 2010-02-15.

Snowboarding at the 2010 Winter Olympics
Men's events at the 2010 Winter Olympics